The Campaign is the second studio album by the American mathcore/deathcore band Into the Moat. It was released on March 17, 2009, by Metal Blade Records.

Critical reception
Exclaim! wrote that Into the Moat "include a few jazzy interludes in The Campaign that provide a nice contrast to the album's general chaotic sound of technical death metal."

Track listing
 The Last Century - 5:23
 From 1,000 Meters... - 3:24
 Advocate vs. Activist - 7:06
 The Fuhrer - 5:54
 Grunt - 4:07
 Law of Conservation - 5:57
 The Siege of Orleans - 2:20
 The Hermit - 7:59

Personnel
 Matt Gossman – drums
 Shawn Ohtani – engineer
 Erik Rutan – producer, engineer, mixing
 Earl Ruwell – vocals
 Adam Santucci – photography
 Ben Slutsky – photography
 Brett Slutsky – layout design
 Nick Ziros – bass guitar
 Kit Wray – guitar

References

2009 albums
Concept albums
Metal Blade Records albums
Into the Moat albums